Norbert Wagner (born 12 April 1961) is a retired German football defender.

References

1961 births
Living people
German footballers
1. FC Nürnberg players
Blau-Weiß 1890 Berlin players
SpVgg Bayreuth players
1. FC Nürnberg II players
Association football defenders
Bundesliga players
2. Bundesliga players
People from Sulzbach-Rosenberg
Sportspeople from the Upper Palatinate
Footballers from Bavaria